Kaushal Singh (born 10 October 1996) is an Indian first-class cricketer who plays for Jharkhand. He made his List A debut on 3 March 2014, for Jharkhand in the 2013–14 Vijay Hazare Trophy. He scored his maiden first-class century in the 2016–17 Ranji Trophy in October 2016.

References

External links
 

1996 births
Living people
Indian cricketers
Jharkhand cricketers
People from Ranchi
Cricketers from Jharkhand